Andy Skoog was a Democratic member of the Illinois House of Representatives representing the 76th district from his appointment in December 2015 to replace Frank Mautino until his loss in the 2016 election to Jerry Lee Long. The 76th district includes Granville, Putnam, Ottawa, LaSalle, Peru, Spring Valley, Oglesby, Streator and Marseilles.

Prior to his tenure in the House, he was the La Salle County Circuit Clerk and before that a member of the North Utica Board of Trustees.

References

External links
Biography, bills and committees at 99th Illinois General Assembly
By session: 99th

Living people
Date of birth missing (living people)
People from North Utica, Illinois
People from LaSalle, Illinois
Illinois city council members
Democratic Party members of the Illinois House of Representatives
Businesspeople from Illinois
Place of birth missing (living people)
Eastern Illinois University alumni
21st-century American politicians
Year of birth missing (living people)